The cryptic myotis (Myotis crypticus) is a European vespertilionid bat. It is a member of the Natterer's bat (M. nattereri) species complex, and is also the closest living relative of M. nattereri. It is mostly distributed across European countries bordering the Mediterranean Sea, from Spain west to Austria, north to Switzerland, and south to most of the Italian Peninsula. Populations of similar bats in southern Italy and Sicily display significant genetic divergence from M. crypticus, and thus may represent a unique taxonomic entity that requires more study. It is found in a wide range of altitudes, from sea level to 1000 meters above. It feeds in forest and grassland habitats and roosts in tree hollows as well as man-made structures. In autumn, M. crypticus swarms with other Myotis in large numbers, and overwinters with them in underground sites such as crevices.

References 

Mouse-eared bats
Mammals described in 2019
Bats of Europe